The 2012 South American Basketball Championship was the 45th edition of the South American Basketball Championship. Eight teams featured the competition, held in Resistencia, Chaco Province, Argentina from 18 to June 22 at the Stadium of Club Atlético Sarmiento. Brazil was the defending champion. The first four places qualified for the 2013 FIBA Americas Championship, the latter of which doubled as the FIBA Americas qualifier for the 2014 World Championship.

Preliminary round

Group A

All times local (UTC−3)

Group B

All times local (UTC−3)

Knockout round

Fifth place match

Semifinals

Third place match

Final

Final standings

References

External links
Official website

South American Basketball Championship
2011–12 in South American basketball
2011–12 in Argentine basketball
International basketball competitions hosted by Argentina